Austrolestes leda is an Australian species of damselfly in the family Lestidae,
commonly known as a wandering ringtail. 
It is found across eastern Australia where it inhabits slow and still water.

Austrolestes leda is a medium-sized to large damselfly, the male is light blue and black.

Gallery

See also
 List of Odonata species of Australia

References 

Lestidae
Odonata of Australia
Insects of Australia
Endemic fauna of Australia
Taxa named by Edmond de Sélys Longchamps
Insects described in 1862
Damselflies